Chad Arthur Wallach (born November 4, 1991) is an American professional baseball catcher in the Los Angeles Angels organization. He was drafted by the Marlins in the fifth round of the 2013 Major League Baseball draft, and made his MLB debut in 2017. He has previously played in MLB for the Cincinnati Reds, Miami Marlins and Angels.

Early life and college
Wallach grew up in Orange, California and attended Calvary Chapel High School in Santa Ana, California. He was selected in the 43rd round of the 2013 Major League Baseball Draft, but opted not to sign in order to play college baseball at Cal State Fullerton. Wallach played three seasons with the Titans, hitting .272 in 102 games. As a junior, Wallach batted .309 with 24 runs scored, 14 doubles, two home runs and 32 RBIs and was drafted by the Miami Marlins in the fifth round of the 2013 Major League Baseball draft.

Professional career

Miami Marlins
Wallach signed with the Marlins and received a $343,900 bonus and began his professional career with the Short-Season Class-A Batavia Muckdogs, where he hit .226/.294/.267 in 43 games and 146 at bats. He began the 2014 season with the Class A Greensboro Grasshoppers (for whom he was a mid-season South Atlantic League All Star) and was eventually promoted to the Class A-Advanced Jupiter Hammerheads, batting .322/.431/.457 between the two teams.

Cincinnati Reds
On December 11, 2014, the Marlins traded Wallach and Anthony DeSclafani to the Cincinnati Reds for Mat Latos. In 2016 for Pensacola he batted .240/.363/.410.

The Reds promoted Wallach to the major leagues for the first time on August 25, 2017. He made his Major League debut on August 27, 2017 in a 5-2 loss to the Pittsburgh Pirates, starting at catcher and going 0-4 with two strikeouts. Wallace got his first career hit on September 20, 2017 as a pinch hitter. During the 2017 season, Wallach played in six games for the Reds and hit .091 (1 for 11). Playing for Louisville, he batted .226/.280/.398.

Second stint with Marlins

He was claimed off waivers by the Miami Marlins on November 3, 2017. He began the 2018 season with the Marlins on the Opening Day roster as their backup catcher but was ultimately sent down to the Triple-A New Orleans Baby Cakes after appearing in nine games when J. T. Realmuto was activated off the disabled list. He hit .224 in 147 at bats with three home runs and 16 RBIs in 44 games, as well as .357/.438/.429 in 14 at bats for the GCL Marlins, before being called back up to the Marlins on September 1, 2018. On September 23, he hit his first career home run. He finished the season batting .178/.275/.267 with one home run and five RBIs in 15 games with the Marlins.

Wallach made the Marlins opening day roster as the team's only backup catcher to start the 2019 season. In 2019 with the Marlins he batted .250/.333/.375 in 48 at bats. Playing for two minor league teams, he was 1-for-10. In 2020 for Miami, Wallach appeared in 15 regular season games, slashing .277/.364/.640 with 1 home run and 6 RBI in 44 at-bats. Wallach also played in five playoff games for the Marlins, where he lodged his first career postseason hit.

Wallach made the Marlins opening day roster again in 2021. Wallach was designated for assignment by Miami on July 24, 2021, after hitting .200/.242/.267 with no home runs in 22 games.

Los Angeles Dodgers
On July 30, 2021, Wallach was claimed off waivers by the Los Angeles Dodgers and assigned to the Triple-A Oklahoma City Dodgers.

Los Angeles Angels
On August 7, 2021, Wallach was claimed off of waivers by the Los Angeles Angels. He was assigned to the Triple-A Salt Lake Bees. Wallach played in 39 games for the Triple-A Salt Lake Bees, hitting .223/.322/.432, and did not appear in a big league game for the Angels. He was outrighted off of the 40-man roster following the season on November 19, 2021. In 2022, he was a non-roster invitee to Angels spring training camp in Tempe, Arizona.

Wallach was selected to the 40-man roster on May 7, 2022. Three days later on May 10, he caught Reid Detmers' no-hitter, and also hit a 3-run homerun.

On November 3, 2022, after being sent outright to Triple-A, Wallach elected free agency. On November 23, Wallach signed a minor league deal with the Angels.

Personal life
His father, Tim Wallach, played in Major League Baseball and is a former bench coach for the Miami Marlins.

See also

 List of second-generation Major League Baseball players

References

External links

Living people
1991 births
Sportspeople from Orange, California
Baseball players from California
Major League Baseball catchers
Cincinnati Reds players
Miami Marlins players
Los Angeles Angels players
Cal State Fullerton Titans baseball players
Batavia Muckdogs players
Greensboro Grasshoppers players
Jupiter Hammerheads players
Salt River Rafters players
Daytona Tortugas players
Peoria Javelinas players
Pensacola Blue Wahoos players
Louisville Bats players
New Orleans Baby Cakes players
Jacksonville Jumbo Shrimp players
Oklahoma City Dodgers players
Salt Lake Bees players
Rochester Honkers players